Compass is an Australian weekly news-documentary program.

The program is devoted to providing information about faith, values, ethics, and religion from across the globe. Compass airs on Sunday night on ABC TV at 6.30pm and is repeated on Wednesday at 1.30pm, it is also found on ABC iview on demand.

In February 2017, the ABC announced that Geraldine Doogue would step down from presenting Compass after nearly 20 years. Kumi Taguchi was announced as her replacement. Late 2020, Kumi Taguchi announced she would no longer present Compass and was leaving the ABC. Geraldine Doogue returned to host the program from 2021 to 2022. In 2023, the ABC announced that Indira Naidoo became the new host.

See also 
 List of programs broadcast by ABC Television
 List of Australian television series
 List of longest-running Australian television series

References

External links 
 Official website

Australian non-fiction television series
Australian Broadcasting Corporation original programming
Religious television series
1988 Australian television series debuts
1990s Australian television series
2000s Australian television series
2010s Australian television series